Nicholas James Groom (born 22 February 1990) is a South African rugby union player. He plays as a scrum-half.

Career
A winner of the Varsity Cup with UCT in 2011, Groom received a swift call up to the Stormers side at the tail-end of the Super Rugby season to replace the injured Dewaldt Duvenhage and Ricky Januarie and he made a couple of substitute appearances. The next 18 months were to see him limited to Western Province appearances and he was a Currie Cup winner with the Streeptruie in 2012. 2013 saw the departure of Duvenhage and Groom was now in a one-on-one fight with Louis Schreuder for the Stormers and Province number 9 jersey and as a result he saw much more game time. He was a Currie Cup runner up in 2013 and he largely had to make do with appearances from the substitutes bench as Schreuder stole a march in the battle to be first choice scrum-half.

He signed a contract to join English Premiership side Northampton Saints at the end of the 2016 Super Rugby season and has since become a regular started for the Midlands side.

Groom has been a regular feature in the Saints' starting side and was instrumental in them securing European Champions Cup rugby for the 2017/18 season, featuring heavily in both the European Champions Cup play-off games where Saints saw off both Connacht Rugby and Stade Francais to secure their spot in the competition for the following season.

On 27 June 2019, Groom returned to the UK with Pro14 side Edinburgh in Scotland from the 2019-20 season. He was released on 22 April 2021 and subsequently signed for Premiership Rugby team London Irish until the end of the 2020–21 season.

International rugby

On 28 May 2016, Groom was included in a 31-man  squad for their three-test match series against a touring  team. After training with the national team for a few days, he joined the South Africa 'A' squad for their two-match series against a touring England Saxons team. He was named in the starting line-up for their first match in Bloemfontein, but ended on the losing side as the visitors ran out 32–24 winners.

Super Rugby statistics

References

External links

Stormers profile
itsrugby.co.uk profile

Living people
1990 births
South African rugby union players
Stormers players
Western Province (rugby union) players
South African people of British descent
White South African people
Rugby union scrum-halves
Sportspeople from Qonce
Alumni of Rondebosch Boys' High School
Northampton Saints players
Lions (United Rugby Championship) players
Golden Lions players
Edinburgh Rugby players
London Irish players
Tel Aviv Heat players
South African expatriate sportspeople in Israel
South African expatriate rugby union players
Expatriate rugby union players in Israel
Rugby union players from the Eastern Cape